Victor Santa Cruz (born April 7, 1972) is an American football coach and former player.  He was most recently the defensive ends coach at Hawaii. Prior to that, he was the head football coach at Azusa Pacific University in Azusa, California from 2006 to 2019.

Playing career
Santa Cruz played college football as a linebacker at the University of Hawaii at Manoa.  He redshirted in 1990 and afterwards became a four-year letterman from 1991 to 1994 for the Hawaii Warriors.

Coaching career

Azusa Pacific 
After serving as an assistant coach at Azusa Pacific for five years, Santa Cruz became head coach after the 2005 season, replacing Pete Shinnick, who left to take on the task of reviving the football program at UNC Pembroke.

Santa Cruz led Azusa Pacific team to the NAIA playoffs in 2010 and 2011. In 2012, Santa Cruz led the program through its transition from NAIA to NCAA Division II. In 2013, he led the Cougars to a 10–2 season, winning the first conference championship in school history and winning the school's second national championship with a 67–0 win over the Greenville Panthers in the 2013 Victory Bowl. In 2014, Santa Cruz led the program to their first ever back to back 10 win season, posting a 10–1 record and winning their second straight conference title. Santa Cruz was named coach of the year in 2013, 2014, and 2016 by the Great Northwest Athletic Conference and in 2013 by the NCCAA.  In 2016, Santa Cruz again led the Cougars to a conference title, and also earned the program's first ever berth in the NCAA Division II football playoffs. As of the end of the 2019 season, Santa Cruz's coaching record at Azusa Pacific was 84-69. He is the program's all-time leader in coaching victories, and ranks third in winning percentage.

University of Hawaii

On January 27, 2020, Santa Cruz was announced as the new defensive coordinator at his alma mater, Hawaii, on Todd Graham's inaugural Hawaii staff. Santa Cruz helped direct a UH defensive unit that led the conference in takeaways and helped lead the Rainbow Warriors to a 28-14 New Mexico Bowl victory over the University of Houston.(2020) Following the 2020 season, Graham wanted to take full responsibility for running the defense and moved Santa Cruz to defensive ends coach & special teams. 

After Todd Graham announced his resignation following player mistreatment allegations, Santa Cruz was not retained by new head coach Timmy Chang for the 2022 season.

Head coaching record

References

External links
 Azusa Pacific profile

1972 births
Living people
American football linebackers
Azusa Pacific Cougars football coaches
Hawaii Rainbow Warriors football coaches
Hawaii Rainbow Warriors football players
High school football coaches in California
Sportspeople from San Diego County, California